Hélder Prista Monteiro (Lisbon, 1922 - 1 November 1994) was a Portuguese playwright and writer. Was known as one of the most successful practitioners of the theatre of the absurd.

References

20th-century Portuguese dramatists and playwrights
1922 births
1994 deaths
20th-century Portuguese male writers
Portuguese male dramatists and playwrights